Liu Shaojun (born July 1962) is a Chinese ichthyologist, professor and doctoral supervisor at Hunan Normal University.

Biography
Liu was born in Changsha, Hunan, in July 1962. His father  was a ichthyologist, professor and academician Chinese Academy of Engineering. His mother Hu Yunjin was also a professor at Hunan Normal University.
He attended the High School Attached to Hunan Normal University. 
He received his bachelor's degree and master's degree from Hunan Normal University in 1986 and 1989, respectively. 
After graduation, he was offered a faculty position at the university.
From 1998 to 1999 he worked in France.
In 2000 he obtained his doctor's degree from Sun Yat-sen University.

Work

Honours and awards
 2003 State Science and Technology Progress Award (Second Class)
 2007 National Science Fund for Distinguished Young Scholars 
 2011 State Science and Technology Progress Award (Second Class)
 2018 National Labor Medal
 2018 State Science and Technology Progress Award (Second Class)
 November 22, 2019 Member of the Chinese Academy of Engineering (CAE)

References

1962 births
Living people
People from Changsha
Biologists from Hunan
Hunan Normal University alumni
Sun Yat-sen University alumni
Academic staff of Hunan Normal University
Members of the Chinese Academy of Engineering
Chinese ichthyologists
Educators from Hunan